Export is the movement of goods, or selling of services out of a country, area or settlement.

Export may also refer to:

Places
 Export, Pennsylvania, a borough of Westmoreland County, Pennsylvania, US
 Export, West Virginia, US
 Export rail station, a goods rail station on the Primorskaya Line, St. Petersburg, Russia

Science and technology
 EXPORT, an Exobiology experiment, developed by ESA, to be externally mounted on the ISS
 Export, converting a computer file into a format other than the original format; See Import and export of data
 export, a language keyword in C++
 export, a Unix command that is usually a shell builtin

Other uses
 Export, a type of Scottish beer
 Valie Export (born 1940), an Austrian artist
 Export of revolution, actions by a victorious revolutionary government to promote similar revolutions in other countries
 Export (cigarette), a Canadian line of cigarettes and rolling tobacco produced by JTI Macdonald

See also
 Exporting, in international trade
 Molson Export, a type of Canadian beer
 Dortmunder Export, a pale lager
 Oland Export Ale is a type of Canadian beer
 Emu Export, a type of Australian beer